The First Aceh Expedition was a punitive expedition of the Royal Netherlands East Indies Army against Aceh.

Early in 1873, the American Consul in Singapore had discussions with an Achenese emissary about a possible Acehnese-American treaty, which the Dutch saw as justification for intervention. In March 1873, the Dutch bombed the Acehnese capital Banda Aceh (Kutaraja) and in April they landed 3,000 troops led by Johan Harmen Rudolf Köhler. Having misjudged their Acehnese opposition, the Dutch were forced to withdraw losing Köhler and eighty men. They then established a blockade and Acehnese troops (estimates of whom range from 10,000 to 100,000) prepared for battle.

This was followed by the Second Aceh Expedition in late 1873.

See also
History of Indonesia
Second Aceh Expedition

References
 

Aceh War
Conflicts in 1873
Dutch conquest of Indonesia